Nubkhesbed ("Gold and Lapis lazuli") was an ancient Egyptian queen of the 20th Dynasty. She was the Great Royal Wife of Pharaoh Ramesses VI and mother of Pharaoh Ramesses VII, Princess Iset (God's Wife of Amun) and Princes Amenherkhepshef and Panebenkemyt.

She is mentioned in her son Amenherkhepshef's tomb KV13 and on a stela of her daughter Iset in Coptos.

Sources

12th-century BC Egyptian women
Queens consort of the Twentieth Dynasty of Egypt
Ramesses VI